Science Communication (from 1979 to 1994 Knowledge: Creation, Diffusion, Utilization) is a peer-reviewed academic journal that covers the field of communication of science and technology. The editor-in-chief is Lee Ann Kahlor (University of Texas at Austin). It was established in 1979 and is published by SAGE Publications.

Abstracting and indexing
The journal is abstracted and indexed in Scopus, CAB Abstracts databases, ERIC, EBSCO databases, ProQuest databases, and the Social Sciences Citation Index. According to the Journal Citation Reports, its 2021 impact factor is 7.441, ranking it 2 out of 94 journals in the category "Communication".

References

External link 

SAGE Publishing academic journals
English-language journals
Communication journals
Quarterly journals
Publications established in 1979